Megalechis is a small genus of freshwater catfish in the Callichthyinae subfamily of the armored catfish family.

Taxonomy
The name is derived from the Greek megas, meaning "great", and the Greek lekis, meaning "plate".

No uniquely derived features are known for Megalechis.

A change in the synonymy of the species of Megalechis occurred in 2005. It is especially confusing because the name M. thoracata remains valid, but applies to the species formerly known as M. personata, which becomes a new junior synonym of M. thoracata. On the other hand, the species formerly known as M. thoracata is now named M. picta.

Species 
There are currently two recognized species in this genus:
 Megalechis picta (J. P. Müller & Troschel, 1849) (Spotted hoplo)
 Megalechis thoracata (Valenciennes, 1840)

Distribution
Both species of Megalechis are distributed east of the Andes in the northern portion of South America, including the Amazonas and Orinoco rivers, as well as the coastal drainages of the Guyanas.

Description
M. thoracata is distinguished from M. picta by a comparatively shorter dorsal fin spine, the anal fin with six (rarely five) branched rays instead of an anal fin with five, rarely four, branched rays, and the caudal fin dotted or dusky often with a clearer band at the base of rays versus a caudal fin with a conspicuous transverse dark band and
dark distal border. Megalechis species grow to about 12–15 centimetres SL.

Reproductive males have an extremely developed pectoral fin spine, like that of Hoplosternum littorale. In M. thoracata, males are also larger than females.

References

 
Callichthyidae
Fish of South America
Catfish genera
Taxa named by Roberto Esser dos Reis
Freshwater fish genera